Barry Owen Somerset Maxwell, 12th Baron Farnham (7 July 1931 – 22 March 2001), was a British peer and baron.

The 12th Lord Farnham was the son of The Honourable Somerset Arthur Maxwell, and grandson of the 11th Baron Farnham. He was educated at Eton and Harvard Business School. On his grandfather's death, he succeeded as the 12th Baron Farnham (and 15th of his family Baronetcy). He was a high ranking freemason and held office in the United Grand Lodge of England as Senior Grand Warden 1977–78, Assistant Grand Master 1982–89, Deputy Grand Master 1989–91, and Pro Grand Master 1991–2001.

Lord Farnham was due to retire on or about his 70th birthday; a few months beforehand, he died, and was succeeded in the barony by his brother, Simon Kenlis Maxwell, who lived in England.

His wife, Diana, was a Lady of the Bedchamber (1987–2021) to Queen Elizabeth II. Lady Farnham rode alongside the Queen on the way to the Diamond Jubilee service on 5 June 2012 in the absence (through illness) of the Duke of Edinburgh.  His sister Sheelin, Viscountess Knollys, served as Chair of South Norfolk District Council and as High Sheriff of Norfolk.

What is now the Farnham Estate Hotel was the on-site replacement to the family seat and its main structure was commissioned around 1780 by the 1st Earl of Farnham and designed by James Wyatt. Its conversion was enabled when Lady Farnham sold it to a local entrepreneur.

References 

Kidd, Charles, Williamson, David (editors). Debrett's Peerage and Baronetage (1990 edition). New York: St Martin's Press, 1990.
 
 
 Senior freemason appointed as Pro Grand Master
 Obituary. (dated 2 April 2001)

External links 
 Cavan County Museum - The Farnham Gallery
 Farnham Estate

1931 births
2001 deaths
People educated at Eton College
Harvard Business School alumni
Freemasons of the United Grand Lodge of England
12